Soraken is a village on the Soraken Peninsula on north-western Bouganville, Papua New Guinea. The railway is now in a state of disrepair. The village also suffered damage during the Bougainville civil crisis.

During World War II, Soraken was liberated from the Japanese in 1945, when the Australian 11th Brigade pushed north to take the Soraken Peninsula.

External links
Transport - Railways - Papua New Guinea

Populated places in the Autonomous Region of Bougainville